Najiballah Karimi (born 1979) is an Afghan football player. He has played for Afghanistan national team.

National team statistics

External links

1979 births
Living people
Afghan footballers
Association football midfielders
Place of birth missing (living people)
Afghanistan international footballers
Footballers at the 2002 Asian Games
Asian Games competitors for Afghanistan